Amine Dahar (born August 5, 1985 in Tunisia), is an Algerian footballer. He currently plays for ES Hammam-Sousse in the CLP-1.

Career
 2005-2006 Etoile du Sahel
 2006-2007 USM Alger
 2007-2008 NA Hussein Dey
 2008-pres. ES Hammam-Sousse

Biography
Dahar began his career with Etoile du Sahel where he progressed through from the junior ranks to the first team. After one season with the first team he left to join Algerian club USM Alger where he rarely featured. After just one season with the club he joined another Alger-based club, NA Hussein Dey. Still finding playing time limited he returned to Tunisia just 6 months later to join ES Hammam-Sousse in the second division. In his first season, Dahar helped the team gain promotion to the CLP-1.

He has been capped by Algeria at the Under-21 level.

References

1985 births
Living people
Algerian footballers
Association football defenders
USM Alger players
NA Hussein Dey players
Étoile Sportive du Sahel players
Algerian expatriate sportspeople in Tunisia
Algeria under-23 international footballers
Algeria youth international footballers
ES Hammam-Sousse players
21st-century Algerian people